Milos Hornik (born ) is a Slovak male volleyball player. He is part of the Slovakia men's national volleyball team. On club level he plays for Spartak Vkp Komarno.

References

Further reading
 Profile at FIVB.org
 Milos Hornik Player Statistics

Slovak men's volleyball players
1990 births
Living people
Place of birth missing (living people)